Reka may refer to:

Places
 Řeka, a village in the Czech Republic
 Reka, Cerkno, a village near Cerkno, Slovenia
 Reka, Laško, a village near Laško, Slovenia
 Reka (Kladovo), a village near Kladovo, Serbia
 Reka, Koprivnica, a village near Koprivnica, Croatia
 Slovene name for Rijeka, a city in northwestern Croatia

or:
 Reka (region), a region in Macedonia, North Macedonia
 Upper Reka, a subregion in Macedonia, North Macedonia
 , a subregion in Macedonia, North Macedonia
 Reka (Metohija), a region in Metohija, Kosovo
 Pusta Reka (region), earlier only Reka, a region in Leskovac Valley, Serbia

Other uses
 Réka, a given name in Hungary
 REKA or Reka One, names for Australian street artist James Reka
 Reka (river), a river in Slovenia and Italy
 Reka dialect, of Macedonian
 Reka Devnia hoard, a hoard of Roman silver
 The River (1933 film) (Czech: Řeka), a 1933 Czechoslovak film
 Upper Reka dialect of Albanian

See also
 Kriva Reka (disambiguation)